Events of 2019 in El Salvador.

Incumbents
 President: Salvador Sánchez Cerén (until 1 June), Nayib Bukele (from 1 June)
 Vice President: Óscar Ortiz (until 1 June), Félix Ulloa (from 1 June)

Events

January

February 
 3 – 2019 Salvadoran presidential election

March

April

May

June

July

August

September

October

November

December

Births

Deaths

References 

 
El Salvador